Real Grupo de Cultura Covadonga is a multisport club based in Gijón, Spain. The club was founded in 1938 and is the biggest sports club in Asturias. It has 33,000 members, more than the most important football clubs of the region (Sporting de Gijón and Real Oviedo).

History
The club was founded on May 10, 1938 with the initial purpose of the club was to create an independent Sports Club. It was based near the beach of San Lorenzo in Gijón. In 1949, Grupo Covadonga purchases lands in the neighbourhood of Las Mestas, near the El Molinón football stadium.

In 2012, Grupo Covadonga was nominated to the Prince of Asturias Awards in the category of Sports.

Notable sportsmen

Mayte Fernández (archery). 1992 Barcelona Olympics
Herminio Menéndez (canoeing). 1976 Montreal Olympics (silver medal), 1980 Moscow Olympics (silver and bronze medals) 
Javier Hernanz (canoeing). 2004 Athens Olympics, 2016 Rio Olympics
María Ángeles Rodríguez (field hockey). 1992 Barcelona Olympics (gold medal)
Juan Fernández (field hockey). 2008 Beijing Olympics (silver medal)
María López (field hockey). 2016 Rio Olympics, 2020 Tokyo Olympics
Mónica Martín (gymnastics). 1996 Atlanta Olympics
Verónica Castro (gymnastics). 1996 Atlanta Olympics
Saúl Cofiño (gymnastics). 2000 Sidney Olympics
José Palacios (gymnastics). 2000 NCAA Champion (Penn State)
Sara Moro (gymnastics). 2000 Sidney Olympics, 2004 Athens Olympics
Iván San Miguel (gymnastics). 2008 Beijing Olympics
Juan de la Puente (handball). 1980 Moscow Olympics, 1984 Los Angeles Olympics, 1988 Seoul Olympics
Chechu Villaldea (handball). Spanish National Team
Carlos Ruesga (handball). 2013 World Champion.
Pablo Carreño (tennis). ATP Tour, 2020 Tokyo Olympics (bronze medal)
José Arconada (track and field). 1992 Barcelona Olympics
Carmen Beatriz Miranda (volleyball). 1992 Barcelona Olympics
Luis Bernardo Martínez (wrestling). 1992 Barcelona Olympics

Sections
Grupo Covadonga has got teams in 18 sports. It also has got a group of traditional dance and a choir.

Basketball team

Volleyball team

There's only women volleyball. The team currently plays in Superliga 2 and it played the Superliga Femenina de Voleibol during two seasons. In 2012 was runner-up of the Copa Princesa de Asturias.

Its young teams won several Spanish championships.

Season by season

Handball team

References

External links
Official website (Spanish)

 
Spanish field hockey clubs
Spanish volleyball clubs
Multi-sport clubs in Spain
Sports teams in Asturias
1938 establishments in Spain